The Thai spelling reform of 1942 was initiated by the government of Prime Minister Field Marshal Plaek Phibunsongkhram. The prime minister's office announced a simplification of the Thai alphabet on 29 May 1942. The announcement was published in the Royal Gazette on 1 June 1942. The reform was cancelled by the government of Khuang Aphaiwong on 2 August 1944. Following the November 1947 coup, Phibunsongkhram became prime minister for a second time, but did not revive the Thai language reform.

Proposed simplification of the Thai writing system 
A significant amount of redundancy of the Thai writing system was retained, in contrast to the simplification undertaken within the Lao language. The changes to simplify Thai spelling were:

All of วรรค ฎ (i.e., ฎ ฏ ฐ ฑ ฒ ณ), the section of the alphabet corresponding to the Indic retroflex consonants, is gone, being replaced by their corresponding consonants in วรรค ด (ด ต ถ ท ธ น).
ใ is uniformly replaced with ไ.
ญ is replaced with ย in initial position (e.g., ใหญ่ > ไหย่), but retained in final position without its "base" (ฐาน).
Of the three high /s/ consonants, ศ ษ ส, only ส is retained (e.g., ศึกษา > สึกสา).
Initial /s/ cluster ทร is replaced by ซ (e.g., กระทรวง > กะซวง).
ห replaces the leading อ in these four words อยาก อย่า อย่าง อยู่ (หยาก หย่า หย่าง หยู่).
Many silent consonants that do not add to the pronunciation are eliminated (e.g., จริง > จิง, ศาสตร์ > สาตร).
Some clusters are reduced (e.g., กระทรวง > กะซวง).

See also
 Thailand in World War II
 Thai cultural mandates

References

Further reading
 Thomas John Hudak, "Spelling Reforms of Field Marshal Pibulsongkram", Crossroads: An Interdisciplinary Journal of Southeast Asian Studies 3, 1 (1986): 123–33.

Thai language
Thai culture
Spelling reform
1942 in Thailand
Cultural history of Thailand